('spices') is a spice mixture or blend used in Middle Eastern cuisines. The mixture of finely ground spices is often used to season lamb and mutton, fish, chicken, beef, and soups, and may also be used as a condiment.

Etymology 
The word originates from the Indian name Bharata, an Indian emperor, as India was historically a large producer and trader of spices with the Middle East.

Ingredients

Composition depends on the region the spice mix is from. Typical ingredients of  may include:
Allspice
Black peppercorns
Cardamom seeds
Cassia bark
Cloves
Coriander seeds
Cumin seeds
Nutmeg
Turmeric
Saffron
Ginger
Dried red chili peppers or paprika
 6 parts paprika
 4 parts black pepper
 4 parts cumin seeds
 3 parts cinnamon
 3 parts cloves
 3 parts coriander seeds
 3 parts nutmeg
 1 part cardamom pods

The mixture can be rubbed into meat or mixed with olive oil and lime juice to form a marinade.

Other variants
In the Levant a spice mix called  ( 'seven spices') is used. Its origins are from Aleppo, Syria. Though it seems to slightly vary from province to province, the typical recipe for it is these following ground spices mixed:
 2 parts cinnamon
 2 parts black pepper
 2 parts cumin
 2 parts cardamom
 2 parts coriander
 1 part nutmeg
 1 part cloves 
 
Turkish baharat includes mint in the largest proportion. In Tunisia, baharat refers to a simple mixture of dried rosebuds and ground cinnamon, often combined with black pepper. In Eastern Arabia, loomi (dried black lime) and saffron may also be used for the kebsa spice mixture (also called ).

See also
Ras el hanout
Advieh
Arab cuisine
Cuisine of Syria
Garam masala

References

Herb and spice mixtures
Arab cuisine
Syrian cuisine
Jordanian cuisine
Iraqi cuisine
Lebanese cuisine
Levantine cuisine
Palestinian cuisine
Israeli cuisine
Kurdish cuisine
Turkish cuisine